Prince Filippo Andrea Doria Pamphili Landi (1 March 1886 – 3 February 1958) was an Italian politician and nobleman, who succeeded his father as the 13th Prince of Melfi in 1914.

Life
The only surviving son of Prince Alfonso Doria Pamphili, a Senator of Italy, and Lady Emily Pelham-Clinton, his grandfather also married an English aristocrat, Lady Mary Talbot, whom he met at Queen Victoria's coronation.

Prince Filippo was the first Mayor of Rome elected after World War II, and its last mayor under the Kingdom of Italy.

In 1921 he married Gesine Mary Dykes, OStJ, a Scottish nurse who had brought him back to health after he had been injured in a sculling accident while at Cambridge.

Known as oppositor of the Fascist regime, he became mayor of Rome in June 1944.

She predeceased him in 1955 and Prince Filippo died in Rome, Italy. Their only child, Princess Orietta, succeeded him as the 14th and last holder of the family's princely title.

See also
 Doria Pamphili family
 Princes of the Holy Roman Empire

References

1886 births
1958 deaths
Nobility from Rome
20th-century Italian politicians
Alumni of Trinity College, Cambridge
Mayors of Rome
Filippo Doria Pamphili Landi
Melfi
Italian anti-fascists